Ken Matthews may refer to:
 Ken Matthews (race walker)
 Ken Matthews (radio)
 Ken Matthews (public servant)